Richard Gough (born 1962) is a Scottish former football defender.

Richard Gough may also refer to:

 Richard Gough (Welsh footballer) (born 1860), Wales international footballer
 Richard Gough (antiquarian) (1735–1809), English antiquarian
 Richard Gough (1635–1723), the author of The History of Myddle
 Richard Gough (1655–1728), British merchant and politician

See also
 Richard McGough (1892–1917), English footballer